Guru Guru is a German krautrock band formed in 1968 as The Guru Guru Groove by Mani Neumeier (drums), Uli Trepte (bass) and Eddy Naegeli (guitar), later replaced by the American Jim Kennedy. After Kennedy collapsed on stage due to a serious illness, Ax Genrich replaced him to complete the classic Guru Guru line up, in time for their debut album in 1970.

Music
Guru Guru were related to the free jazz music scene through their work with Swiss pianist Irène Schweizer and through Neumeier, who had already won several jazz prizes. The band was also influenced by psychedelic rock artists, such as Jimi Hendrix, Frank Zappa, The Crazy World Of Arthur Brown, Rolling Stones and early Pink Floyd.

Among the band's closest musical colleagues were Amon Düül, Can and Xhol Caravan, with whom Guru Guru played jam sessions.

Frontman Mani Neumeier (drummer and singer) has an original style of playing drums, and is known in the European jazz rock-scene. He was also involved in numerous other projects, including Tiere der Nacht, The Psychedelic Monsterjam, Damo Suzuki's Network, Globe Unity Orchestra, Harmonia, Acid Mothers Guru Guru, Voodootrance and Lover 303.

Social environment
Guru Guru's live performances in the late 1960s and early 1970s were politically left-oriented. They organized concerts together with the Socialist German Student Union, read political texts between the songs, and sporadically gave concerts in prisons. Their shows were extravagant and anarchistic, some of the musicians lived together in a commune in the German Odenwald region, experimented with hallucinogens (one of their songs is titled "The LSD March" / German: "Der LSD-Marsch").

Publicity
Guru Guru has released over 40 LPs and CDs, and has sold over 500,000 records. The band has played numerous live concerts, appeared in films, radio and television. In 1976, Guru Guru was the first German band to play live on the WDR TV show Rockpalast.

Discography
1970 UFO
1971 Hinten
1972 Känguru
1973 Guru Guru
1973 Don't Call Us, We Call You
1974 Dance of the Flames
1974 Der Elektrolurch (2 LP)
1975 Mani und seine Freunde
1976 Tango Fango
1977 Globetrotter
1978 Live (2 LP)
1979 Hey du
1981 Mani in Germani
1983 Mani Neumeiers neue Abenteuer (aka Guru Mani ... )
1987 Jungle
1988 Guru Guru 88
1988 Live 72
1992 Shake Well – MC
1993 Shake Well
1995 Wah Wah
1996 Mask (limited edition)
1997 Moshi Moshi
1999 Live 98 (3-CD set, also on 2 LP)
2000 2000 Gurus
2003 Essen 1970 (live)
2005 In the Guru Lounge
2007 Wiesbaden 1972 (live)
2008 PSY
2009 Live on tour 2008
2009 Wiesbaden 1973 (live)
2011 Doublebind
2011 Live in Germany '71
2013 Electric Cats
2016 Acid Guru Pond (Split Album: Bardo Pond, Guru Guru, Acid Mothers Temple)
2018 Rotate

See also 
List of ambient music artists

References

External links

 (with Mani Neumeier)
Interview with Mani Neumeier

Experimental musical groups
Krautrock musical groups
German psychedelic rock music groups
Musical groups established in 1968
Brain Records artists
Ohr label artists